"Let Me Belong to You" is a song written and recorded in 1961 by Canadian singer Peter Udell and Gary Geld and performed by American singer Brian Hyland. It peaked at number 20 on the Billboard Hot 100 in 1961.

Chart performance

Weekly charts

References

1961 songs
1961 singles
Songs with music by Gary Geld
Songs with lyrics by Peter Udell
Brian Hyland songs